Francesco d'Este may refer to:

 Francesco d'Este (14th century) (?–1312), son of Obizzo II, brother of Azzo VIII d'Este, of Aldobrandino and Fresco d'Este
 Francesco d'Este (1325–1384), son of Bertoldo I d'Este
 Francesco d'Este (1516–1578) son of Alfonso I d'Este and Lucrezia Borgia
 Francesco I d'Este, Duke of Modena (1610–1658), son of Alfonso III d'Este
 Francesco II d'Este, Duke of Modena (1660–1694), son of Alfonso IV d'Este
 Francesco III d'Este, Duke of Modena (1698–1780), son of Rinaldo d'Este
 Francis IV, Duke of Modena (1779–1886), son of Ferdinand Karl, Archduke of Austria–Este